It's Always Fair Weather is a 1955 MGM musical satire scripted by Betty Comden and Adolph Green, who also wrote the show's lyrics, with music by André Previn and starring Gene Kelly, Dan Dailey, Cyd Charisse, Dolores Gray, and dancer/choreographer Michael Kidd in his first film acting role.

The film, co-directed by Kelly and Stanley Donen, was made in CinemaScope and Eastmancolor. Although well-received critically at the time, it was not a commercial success, and is widely regarded as the last of the major MGM dance-oriented musicals. In recent years, it has been recognized as a seminal film because of the inventiveness of its dance routines.

It's Always Fair Weather is noted for its downbeat theme, which may have hurt it at the box office, and has been called a rare "cynical musical".

Plot

Three ex-G.I.s, Ted Riley, Doug Hallerton and Angie Valentine have served in World War II together and become best friends. At the beginning of the film, set in October 1945, they meet at their favorite New York bar, Tim's Bar and Grill before their release from the service. When Riley receives a Dear John letter from his girlfriend telling him she has married another man, his friends comfort him and join him hitting every other bar in town. They dance drunkenly through the street together ("The Binge") before returning to Tim's. Barman Tim is dubious about their vows of eternal friendshiphaving heard similar claims made by many other discharged servicemenand wagers them they will forget about each other. The trio protest that they will be different and promise to reunite exactly ten years later at the same spot, tearing a dollar bill in three parts and writing the date of October 11, 1955 on each piece.

In the years after the war, the three men take entirely different paths, as shown through the "10-Year Montage". Riley had wanted to become an idealistic lawyer, but instead has become a fight promoter and gambler, associating with shady underworld characters. Hallerton, who had planned to become a painter, has gone into a high-stress job in advertising, and his marriage is crumbling. Valentine, who had planned to become a gourmet chef, is now running a hamburger stand in Schenectady, New York that he calls "The Cordon Bleu." He has a wife and several children.

The three men keep their promise to meet at the bar ten years later, and quickly realize that they now have nothing in common and dislike each other. Hallerton and Riley view Valentine as a "hick", while Riley and Valentine think Hallerton is a "snob", and Hallerton and Valentine think Riley is a "punk". Sitting together in an expensive restaurant as Hallerton's guest, munching celery, they silently express their regrets in "I Shouldn't Have Come", sung to the tune of "The Blue Danube".

At the restaurant, they encounter some people from Hallerton's advertising agency, including Jackie Leighton, an attractive and brainy advertising executive. Jackie gets the idea of reuniting the three men later that evening on a TV show hosted by Madeline Bradville. She and Riley gradually become involved, though at first Jackie seems motivated by wanting to get Riley on her show. She joins Riley at Stillman's gym, where Jackie demonstrates a deep knowledge of boxing while cavorting with beefy boxers to the tune of "Baby You Knock Me Out".

Riley gets into trouble with mobsters because he refuses to fix a fight. Evading the gangsters by dashing inside a roller skating ring, he skates out on the streets of Manhattan, where he realizes that Jackie's affection for him has built up his self-esteem, and he dances exuberantly on roller skates ("I Like Myself"). Hallerton, meanwhile, has misgivings about the corporate life ("Situation-Wise").

The three men are reluctantly coaxed into the TV reunion, while the gangsters track Riley inside the studio. The three ex-service buddies fight and defeat the gangsterstricking the head mobster into confessing on live television. The brawl brings the trio  back together and they escape from the studio when the police arrive. At the end, they are friends again, but go their separate ways without making plans for another reunion ("The Time for Parting").

Cast 

Gene Kelly as Ted Riley
Dan Dailey as Doug Hallerton
Cyd Charisse as Jackie Leighton
Dolores Gray as Madeline Bradville
Michael Kidd as Angie Valentine
David Burns as Tim
Jay C. Flippen as Charles Z. Culloran

Uncredited

Steve Mitchell  as Kid Mariacchi
Hal March as Rocky Heldon
Paul Maxey as Mr. Fielding
Peter Leeds as Mr. Trasker
Alex Gerry as Mr. Stamper
Madge Blake as Mrs. Stamper
Wilson Wood as Roy, television director
Richard Simmons as Mr. Grigman
Herb Vigran as Nashby
Lou Lubin as Lefty
Saul Gorss as Henchman
Terry Wilson as Henchman
John Indrisano as Henchman 
Frank Nelson as the Emcee

June Foray voice of Molly Mop

Production history

Betty Comden and Adolph Green originally conceived this film as a sequel to On the Town; to reunite Gene Kelly with his On the Town  co-stars Frank Sinatra and Jules Munshin; it was to be produced as a Broadway show. At Kelly's insistence, however, they made it into an MGM musical. Kelly, at this point in his life, had been making films in Europe, such as Invitation to the Dance, to take advantage of a tax law for resident Americans. But the films in Europe failed and the tax law was revoked, forcing Kelly to return to America.

MGM, under new production chief Dore Schary, did not want to hire either Sinatra or Munshin; the former due to his difficult working reputation, the latter because he was not popular with audiences anymore. Ultimately, Kelly chose fellow dancers Dan Dailey, who was under contract to MGM, and Michael Kidd, who had more choreographic than acting experience (he choreographed the Broadway and film versions of Guys and Dolls, as well as The Band Wagon). Kelly was also forced to shoot the movie in Cinemascope, which he felt did not suit screen dancing. Many of the numbers in the film, such as "The Binge" and "Once Upon a Time" show Kelly's efforts to make use of Cinemascope. Comden and Green wrote the songs with André Previn providing the music as well as the accompanying score; it was his second major assignment on an MGM film, after Bad Day at Black Rock.

Kelly asked his old friend and collaborator Stanley Donen to co-direct with him. Donen, who had just scored a major success with Seven Brides for Seven Brothers (with Kidd as choreographer), did not want to go back to collaborating with Kelly, but reluctantly agreed. Kelly and Donen clashed over creative issues in the film, with Donen tending to side with Kidd against Kelly. After this film, Donen and Kelly never worked together again, and their friendship ended permanently, as Donen later confirmed.

Reception

It's Always Fair Weather received good reviews when it came out, Variety calling it a "delightful musical satire", while Bosley Crowther of The New York Times wrote it was a "bright film" that spoofed "the whiskers off TV". It was also voted one of the year's 10 best films by the New York Film Critics. However, the studio did not open it with the fanfare it had given previous musicals. Instead, it was released as part of a drive-in double bill with Bad Day at Black Rock, and the studio did not make its money back. The film's bleakness may have had something to do with it (audiences at the time were not accustomed to unhappy musicals); but also, more Americans were staying at home with television than going to the movies at this time. André Previn claims the film's failure had to do with its being a musical; he felt that it would have been a good film had it not had any songs. On Rotten Tomatoes, the film has an aggregate score of 88% based on 7 positive and 1 negative critic review.

In her book 5001 Nights at the Movies, critic Pauline Kael called the film a "delayed hangover", and wrote that its "mixture of parody, cynicism and song and dance is perhaps a little sour". She had praise for Dailey's "Situationwise" number and wrote that "to a great extent this is Dailey's movie".

The film was nominated in 1955 for Academy Awards for Best Scoring of a Musical Picture and for Best Story and Screenplay.

In recent years, the film's reputation has grown among fans of musicals and of Gene Kelly, whose dance on roller skates to "I Like Myself" is seen as the last great dance solo of his career. Scenes from the film were included in MGM's 1976 film That's Entertainment, Part II, in a segment hosted by Kelly and Fred Astaire.

The film is recognized by American Film Institute in these lists:
 2006: AFI's Greatest Movie Musicals – Nominated

Awards and nominations

Box office 
According to MGM records, the film earned $1,380,000 in the U.S. and Canada and $994,000 elsewhere, resulting in a loss of $1,675,000.

Soundtrack

Soundtrack recordings have been issued by Rhino Records and in 1991 by Sony Music.

Track listing:

Lyrics by Betty Comden and Adolph Green; music score by André Previn. All pieces played by MGM Studio Orchestra conducted by André Previn. Between brackets the singers.

 "Overture" 1:04
 "March, March" (Gene Kelly, Dan Dailey, Michael Kidd) 1:21
 "The Binge" 5:07
 "The Time for Parting" (Gene Kelly, Dan Dailey, Michael Kidd) 2:01
 "10-Year Montage" 2:18
 "The Blue Danube (I Shouldn't Have Come)" (Gene Kelly, Dan Dailey, Michael Kidd) 2:30
 "Music Is Better Than Words" (Dolores Gray) 2:10
 "Stillman's Gym" (Lou Lubin) 2:10
 "Baby You Knock Me Out" (Carol Richards [singing for Cyd Charisse], Lou Lubin) 2:40
 "The Ad Men" (Dan Dailey, Paul Maxey) 0:48
 "Once Upon a Time" (Gene Kelly, Dan Dailey, Michael Kidd) 3:33
 "Situation-Wise" (Dan Dailey) 2:49
 "The Chase" 1:04
 "I Like Myself" (Gene Kelly) 4:10
 "Klenzrite" (Dolores Gray) 1:34
 "Thanks a Lot, but No, Thanks" (Dolores Gray) 3:47
 "The Time for Parting (Finale)" (David Burns and chorus) 1:46

See also
List of American films of 1955

References

Citations

Additional sources
Gene Kelly: Anatomy of a Dancer
Hugh Fordin: The World of Entertainment,

External links

1950s satirical films
1955 films
1955 musical comedy films
1955 romantic comedy films
American boxing films
American musical comedy films
American romantic comedy films
American romantic musical films
American satirical films
André Previn albums
CinemaScope films
Films about advertising
Films about television
Films about veterans
Films directed by Gene Kelly
Films directed by Stanley Donen
Films produced by Arthur Freed
Films scored by André Previn
Films set in 1945
Films set in 1955
Films set in New York City
Films with screenplays by Betty Comden and Adolph Green
Metro-Goldwyn-Mayer films
1950s English-language films
1950s American films